The 1993 Cork Senior Football Championship was the 105th staging of the Cork Senior Football Championship since its establishment by the Cork County Board in 1887. The draw for the opening fixtures took place on 13 December 1992. The championship began on 25 April 1993 and ended on 31 October 1993.

O'Donovan Rossa were the defending champions, however, they were defeated by Nemo Rangers at the quarter-final stage.

On 31 October 1993, Nemo Rangers won the championship following a 0-13 to 0-04 defeat of St. Finbarr's in the final. This was their 10th championship title overall and their first title since 1988.

Colin Corkery from the Nemo Rangers club was the championship's top scorer with 4-36.

Team changes

To Championship

Promoted from the Cork Intermediate Football Championship
 Mallow

Results

First round

Second round

Quarter-finals

Semi-finals

Final

Championship statistics

Top scorers

Overall

In a single game

Miscellaneous
At the monthly meeting of the Cork County Board on 20 July 1993, Glanmire were fined £500 for their failure to fulfil their fixture with O'Donovan Rossa on 3 July. O'Donovan Rossa were entitled to be awarded the game, however, they sought a refixture of the game.

References

Cork Senior Football Championship